The Collins Waterfront Architectural District is a historic district in Miami Beach, Florida, that includes 110 contributing buildings and structures built in the late 1940s, 1950s and 1960s, centering on Collins Avenue. The predominant styles include moderne, Art Deco and Mediterranean Revival architecture, as well as the local Miami Modern style. The chief contributing resources are large resort hotels. The district is bounded by the Atlantic Ocean on the east, and by 24th Street, Indian Creek Drive, Pine Tree Drive and the Collins Canal. The district is part of Mid-Beach.

The district was placed on the National Register of Historic Places on November 15, 2011. Separately listed on the NRHP already were contributing properties Cadillac Hotel, designed by Roy France, and Ocean Spray Hotel.  The district includes an automotive bridge and a pedestrian bridge.

A hotel included in the district is Casa Faena.

See also
 Miami Modern architecture
 List of Collins Waterfront Architectural District contributing properties

References

External links

Geography of Miami-Dade County, Florida
National Register of Historic Places in Miami-Dade County, Florida
Buildings and structures in Miami Beach, Florida
Historic districts on the National Register of Historic Places in Florida
Art Deco architecture in Florida
Historic American Buildings Survey in Florida
Moderne architecture in Florida
Mediterranean Revival architecture in Florida